Jennifer E Taffs (born ) is a Zimbabwean-born former Australian cricketer. She is an all-rounder who bats right-handed and bowls slow left-arm orthodox. She played for the Australian Capital Territory and the Melbourne Renegades, totalling nine List A matches and 28 T20 matches. In May 2021, she was named women's assistant coach of the Prahran Cricket Club.

Taffs was born in Zimbabwe, the daughter of John and Val Taffs. She spent the first years of her life growing up on a tobacco farm in Chipinge. In 2001, her family emigrated to Australia, settling in Coffs Harbour, New South Wales.

Notes

References

External links
 
 

1990s  births
Living people
Australian cricketers
Australian women cricketers
ACT Meteors cricketers
Naturalised citizens of Australia
Melbourne Renegades (WBBL) cricketers
People from Coffs Harbour
Sportswomen from New South Wales
Zimbabwean emigrants to Australia